Per Funch Jensen (25 September 1938 – 16 July 1960) was a Danish footballer. He played in four matches for the Denmark national football team in 1959.

References

External links
 

1938 births
1960 deaths
Danish men's footballers
Denmark international footballers
Place of birth missing
Association footballers not categorized by position
Footballers killed in the 1960 Danish football air crash